This is a list of series released by or aired on TVB Jade Channel in 1984.

First line series
These dramas aired in Hong Kong from 7:00pm to 8:00pm, Monday to Friday on TVB.

Second line series
These dramas aired in Hong Kong from 8:00pm to 8:30pm, Monday to Friday on TVB.

Third line series
These dramas aired in Hong Kong from 8:30pm to 9:30pm, Monday to Friday on TVB.

External links
TVB.com Official Website 

TVB dramas